Ralph Heinert Jr. is a former  American engineer and politician from Montana. Heinert is a former Republican member of Montana House of Representatives.

Early life 
On August 26, 1944, Heinert was born in Belle Fourche, South Dakota.

Education 
In 1967, Heinert earned a Bachelor of Science degree in Mechanical Engineering from South Dakota School of Mines and Technology in Rapid City, South Dakota.

Career 
In 1967, Heinert became an Engineer for  American Oil Company, until 1968. In 1968, Heinert was an Engineer for Anaconda Forest Products, until 1972. In 1975, Heinert became a Project Engineer for Champion International Corporation. In 1981, Heinery became a Manager at Champion International Corporation, until 2000.

On November 2, 2004, Heinert won the election and became a Republican member of Montana House of Representatives for District 1. Heinert defeated Eileen J. Carney and Russell D. Brown with 48.71% of the votes. Heinert won by 49 votes. On November 7, 2006, as an incumbent, Heinert won the election and continued serving District 1. Heinert defeated Eileen J. Carney and Russell D. Brown with 47.70% of the votes.

Personal life 
Heinert's wife is Rita Heinert. They have three children. Heinert and his family live in Libby, Montana.

See also 
 Montana House of Representatives, District 1

References

External links 
 Montana House - 2005
 Ralph Heinert will not file for re-election State Representative from District 1 (January 31, 2008)

1944 births
Living people
Republican Party members of the Montana House of Representatives
People from Belle Fourche, South Dakota
People from Libby, Montana